Ambrogio Traversari, also referred to as Ambrose of Camaldoli (138620 October 1439), was an Italian monk and theologian who was a prime supporter of the papal cause in the 15th century. He is honored as a saint by the Camaldolese Order.

Biography
Traversari was born near Forlì, in the village of Portico di Romagna in 1386.  At the age of 14 he entered the Camaldolese Order in the Monastery of St. Mary of the Angels in Florence, and rapidly became a leading theologian and Hellenist. In his study of Greek literature his master was Emmanuel Chrysoloras. He worked primarily as a scholar until he became prior general of the Order in 1431.

Ambrose emerged as a leading advocate of papal primacy. This attitude he showed clearly when he attended the Council of Basel as legate of Pope Eugene IV and defended the primacy of the pope, adjuring the council not to "rend asunder Christ's seamless robe". He was next sent by the pope to the Emperor Sigismund to ask his aid in the pope's efforts to end this council, which for five years had been encroaching on papal prerogatives. The pope transferred the council from Basel to Ferrara on 18 September 1437.

So strong was Ambrose's hostility to some of the delegates that he described Basel as a western Babylon. He likewise supported the pope at Ferrara and Florence, and worked hard in the attempt to reconcile the Eastern and Western Churches. But in this council, and later, in that of Florence, Ambrose, by his efforts and charity toward some poor Greek bishops, greatly helped to bring about a union of the two Churches, the decree for which, 6 July 1439, he was called on to draw up.

He died soon after. His feastday is celebrated by the Camaldolese Order on 20 November.

Character
According to the author of his biography in the eleventh edition of the Encyclopædia Britannica: "Ambrose is interesting as typical of the new humanism which was growing up within the church. Thus while among his own colleagues he seemed merely a hypocritical and arrogant priest, in his relations with his brother humanists, such as Cosimo de' Medici, he appeared as the student of classical antiquities and especially of Greek theological authors".

Works
His works include a treatise on the Holy Eucharist, one on the Procession of the Holy Spirit, many lives of saints, as well as a history of his term as prior general of the Camaldolese. He also translated from Greek into Latin a life of John Chrysostom (Venice, 1533); the Spiritual Wisdom of John Moschus; The Ladder of Divine Ascent of John Climacus (Venice, 1531), P.G., LXXXVIII.  Between 1424 and 1433 he worked on the translation of the Lives and Opinions of Eminent Philosophers by Diogenes Laërtius, which came to be widely circulated in manuscript form. He also translated four books against the errors of the Greeks, by Manuel Kalekas, Patriarch of Constantinople, a Dominican friar (Ingolstadt, 1608), P.G., CLII, col. 13-661, a work known only through Ambrose's translation.

He also translated many homilies of John Chrysostom; the writings of Dionysius Areopagita (1436); Basil of Caesarea's treatise on virginity; thirty-nine discourses of Ephrem the Syrian, and many other works of the Fathers and writers of the Greek Church. Dom Mabillon's Letters and Orations of St. Ambrose of Camaldoli was published in Florence in 1759.

Selected works:
Hodoeporicon, diary of a journey visiting the monasteries of Italy
Epistolarium, correspondence
translations of
Palladius, Life of Chrysostom
Ephraem Syrus, Nineteen Sermons of Ephraem Syrus
Basil of Caesarea, On Virginity
Diogenes Laërtius, Vitae philosophorum (Lives and Opinions of Eminent Philosophers)
Pseudo-Dionysius the Areopagite (1436)

A number of his manuscripts remain in the library of Saint Mark in Venice.

See also
Traversari
The Baptism of Christ (Piero della Francesca)

References

Attribution

Further reading

External links

 Letters – a few letters in the original Latin and a portrait of him from a manuscript he copied.
 
 Contains short biography

1386 births
1439 deaths
People from Portico e San Benedetto
14th-century Christian saints
15th-century Christian saints
15th-century Italian Roman Catholic theologians
Camaldolese saints
Medieval Italian saints
Italian Benedictines
Benedictine saints
Benedictine scholars
Benedictine theologians
15th-century Italian Roman Catholic priests
Greek–Latin translators
15th-century Italian writers
Italian Renaissance humanists